Aly/REF export factor, also known as THO complex subunit 4 is a protein that in humans is encoded by the ALYREF gene.

The ALYREF gene encodes Aly/REF export factor (ALY; THO complex subunit 4, Tho4; RNA and export factor binding protein 1, Refbp1), a ubiquitously expressed nuclear protein that functions as a molecular chaperone and export adapter involved in nuclear export of spliced and unspliced mRNA. The TRanscription-EXport (TREX) complex, a key player in mRNA export, includes the THO subcomplex, the RNA helicase UAP56, and the RNA-binding protein ALY. In yeast, TREX is recruited co-transcriptionally; in human cells it is recruited during a late step of splicing. The human TREX complex is recruited to a region near the 5' end of mRNA by interaction of ALY and THO with the nuclear cap-binding complex. As a chaperone, ALY promotes dimerization of transcription factors containing basic leucine zipper (bZIP) domains., thereby promoting transcriptional activation. ALY has key roles in 3'-end processing of polyadenylated mRNAs and in nuclear export of both polyadenylated and non-polyadenylated mRNAs. After mRNA binds to ALY, it is apparently transferred to the NXF1-NXT1 heterodimer for export (TAP/NFX1 pathway). The full-length ALY protein (Refbp1-I, 255 amino acids encoded by six exons) has a conserved RNA recognition motif (RRM; amino acids 105-182) flanked by alanine/arginine/glycine-rich sequences; an N-terminal region (amino acids 16-37) is sufficient for RNA binding and interaction with the NXF1-NXT1 heterodimer.

References

Further reading

External links